is a Japanese singer and actress based in South Korea. She is a member of the South Korean girl group Le Sserafim.

Miyawaki began her music career with the girl group HKT48 in 2011, and was a concurrent member of their sister group AKB48 from 2014 to 2018. During her tenure, she held center positions for the singles "Kimi wa Melody" and "No Way Man". Miyawaki took a hiatus from HKT48 in 2018 after placing second in the reality competition show Produce 48, joining the girl group Iz*One until 2021.

Career

2011–2017: Career beginnings 
Miyawaki joined HKT48 as a first generation trainee in July 2011. She made her first official appearance as an HKT48 member on October 23 at a national handshake event for the song "Flying Get". She made her theater debut on November 26 with a revival of SKE48 Team S stage "Te wo Tsunaginagara".

Miyawaki was officially promoted to full member status of HKT48 Team H on March 4, 2012, along with 15 other trainees.

In 2012, Miyawaki became the first HKT48 member to have ranked in the AKB48 general election. She received 6,635 votes, placing her at the 47th position. Later that year, she landed her first A-side participation on AKB48's 28th single "Uza". Although she did not make the A-side for the 29th and 30th singles, she appeared on the A-side for the 31st single, "Sayonara Crawl", released on May 22, 2013, and placed 26th overall in AKB48's 2013 general election with 25,760 votes.

Miyawaki's first A-side participation with HKT48 was on its first single "Suki! Suki! Skip!" (Like! Like! Skip!) and Melon Juice.

On January 11, 2014, it was announced during the first day of HKT48's Kyushu 7 Prefecture Tour at Oita, that Miyawaki would be transferred to the newly formed Team KIV. Later, at AKB48's Group Grand Reformation Festival, she was promoted to vice captain of Team KIV and given a concurrent position in AKB48 Team A.

Miyawaki participated in the 2014 AKB48 general election and placed 11th overall with 45,538 votes, landing her a position on the A-side for "Kokoro no Placard". In that year's rock-paper-scissors tournament, Miyawaki lost in the 3rd round of the preliminary competition. However, management decided she would share the lead position with winner Mayu Watanabe for AKB48's 38th single, "Kiboteki Refrain", and became the first local HKT48 member to have lead position on an A-side single.

In 2015, Miyawaki was given a lead role in AKB48's drama Majisuka Gakuen 4 along with Haruka Shimazaki. The season premiered on January 19. She placed 7th overall in the general election the same year with 81,422 votes.

In July 2015, she released her first photobook, titled Sakura which reached number 1 on the weekly Oricon photobook chart and number 3 on the general book chart.

She got her first solo lead position on AKB's 43rd single with "Kimi wa Melody", released on March 9, 2016.

2018–2021: Produce 48, Iz*One, graduation from HKT48 

In 2018, Miyawaki participated and placed second in reality girl group survival show Produce 48 and became a member of Korean-Japanese idol group Iz*One that debuted in October of the same year. She and the other two Japanese members of the group took a hiatus from their respective Japanese groups until their contracts with Iz*One expired in April 2021. She also launched her own video gaming channel on YouTube. As of August 6, 2021, Miyawaki has over 692,000 subscribers and garnering 22 million video views.

After Iz*One's disbandment in April 2021, a preview of her interview with the July issue of Vivi leaked that she was leaving HKT48. On May 15, 2021, Miyawaki confirmed her departure, with a graduation concert scheduled to be held on June 19. A short version for the music video of her graduation song, was uploaded to YouTube on June 14, while the official audio was released on June 20. Her final performance with HKT48 was on June 27. In May 2021, Miyawaki became the face of the hair care brand Kerastase and the Chinese cosmetics brand Flower Knows. On November 1, 2021, Vernalossom announced that Miyawaki's contract with them has concluded.

2022–present: Debut with Le Sserafim
 
On March 14, 2022, Miyawaki, alongside former Iz*One member Kim Chae-won, signed exclusive contracts with Source Music, and were confirmed to debut as members of Le Sserafim in May. On March 21, 2022, she joined Japanese talent agency A.M. Entertainment for individual activities in Japan.  On May 2, 2022, Le Sserafim made their debut with the extended play, Fearless.

AKB48 General Election placements 
Miyawaki's placements in AKB48's annual general elections:

Discography

Composition credits 
All song credits are adapted from the Korea Music Copyright Association's database, unless otherwise noted.

Filmography

Film

Television series

Web series

Web shows

Television show

Radio show

Bibliography

Solo photobooks

Notes

References

External links 

1998 births
Living people
21st-century Japanese actresses
21st-century Japanese women singers
AKB48 members
HKT48 members
Iz*One members
Le Sserafim members
Japanese female idols
Japanese expatriates in South Korea
Japanese women pop singers
Japanese K-pop singers
Japanese television actresses
Korean-language singers of Japan
Musicians from Kagoshima Prefecture
Produce 48 contestants
Swing Entertainment artists
Reality show winners
People from Kagoshima
Hybe Corporation artists